The 2022 Asian Women's Youth Handball Championship was 9th edition of the championship held from 18 to 25 March 2022 in Almaty, Kazakhstan under the aegis of Asian Handball Federation. It was the first time in history that the championship was organised by the Kazakhstan Handball Federation. It also acted as the qualification tournament for the 2022 Women's Youth World Handball Championship, with top two teams from the championship directly qualifying for the event to be held in Georgia.

Previously the championship was scheduled to be held from 20 to 29 November 2021, but was postponed due to the spread of COVID-19 pandemic. In January 2022, the championship was further postponed from scheduled dates of 13 to 20 February due to the 2022 Kazakh unrest.

Draw
The draw was held on 28 December 2021 in Almaty, Kazakhstan.

Seeding
Teams were seeded according to the AHF COC regulations and rankings of the previous edition of the championship. Teams who did not participated in the previous edition were in Pot 4.

Chinese Taipei, Kuwait and South Korea withdrew from the tournament after the draw.

Results
''All times are local (UTC+6).

References

External links

Asian Handball Championships
Asian Women's Youth Handball Championship
Sports competitions in Almaty
Asian Youth Handball Championship
International handball competitions hosted by Kazakhstan
Women's handball in Kazakhstan
Asian Women's Youth Handball Championship